Christian Gallardo is an American gymnastics coach, most notably the personal coach of Gabby Douglas at Buckeye Gymnastics since 2014. He has also coached multiple other USA National Team Members including Nia Dennis, Shania Adams, and Shilese Jones.

He now co-owns and operates a gymnastics club - Future Gymnastics Academy.

References

External links 

Year of birth missing (living people)
Living people
People from El Paso, Texas
American gymnastics coaches